Zazula is a surname. Notable people with the surname include:

Jon Zazula (1952–2022), American record label owner and producer
Frank Zazula (1916–1999), American sports coach

Surnames of Slavic origin